The 2002 UTEP Miners football team represented the University of Texas at El Paso in the 2002 NCAA Division I-A football season. The team's head coach was Gary Nord. The Miners played their home games at the Sun Bowl Stadium in El Paso, Texas. The miners averaged 30,152 fans in 2002.

Schedule

References

UTEP
UTEP Miners football seasons
UTEP Miners football